is a first-person shooter mech simulation video game developed and published by Sega, and released in 1995 for the Genesis/Mega Drive's 32X add-on, allowing for fully texture-mapped 3D polygons.

Gameplay 

The game's North American box states "1 or 2 Players", but Sega has confirmed that this was a typographical error and that Metal Head is single player only.

Metal Head's levels are broken down into missions, though most of the missions are to destroy all of the enemies in that particular area using the Mech's various projectile weapons.  The time the user have remaining for each mission will count down and is displayed below the power gauge health bar.  Before each mission a talking head appears of presumably one of the superior commanders in the Federation Armed Forces/Federation Police, and will instruct the user of the objective of the mission, which includes full voice-acting. A summary of the current mission will also appear when the game is paused.

Designed for Sega's 6-button controller, the game uses a first-person view looking through the windshield of one of the game's 'Metal Head' mechs. The player can switch between multiple camera angles. Below the screen is a control panel displaying the remaining health status, represented by a power-gauge and a percentage number, the time the user has remaining for the mission, the weapon the user is currently accessing and a screen displaying various other information for what is required (i.e. a 'miss' when the user does not hit an enemy target).

In the top-right of the quadrant of the screen is a map of the level.  The user's vehicle is represented as a triangle and remaining enemies' vehicles are represented as pulsating circles, which allows navigation throughout each level.

Story 

Five years after the 'World Federation' was established strife and war are still on the rise.  In order to keep the peace the Federation Armed Forces, part of the Federation Police, build fully armed, bipedal Mechs also known as 'Metal Heads'.  The Metal Head's success causes a heavy militarization of the countries of the Federation.

A sudden and chaotic revolution led by terrorists, armed with their own fully armed Mechs, breaks out and the terrorists take control of a whole country.  The player character (in a Metal Head) is sent in with his team to liberate the country's capital.

The player character starts in a small border town and works his way in to reach the capital.

Development and release

Reception 

In an early preview of the game in December 1994, Computer and Video Games praised the use of multiple camera angles similar to Virtua Racing and said the "most striking aspect" is the 3D graphics, with the backdrops being "nothing short of spectacular" and "the most detailed 3D backdrops" on the Mega Drive, as well as the "equally detailed" enemy troops including robots and jeeps.

Upon release, GameFan magazine's Dave Halverson called it "an excellent first generation" 32X game while Nick Rox called it "the best game of its kind!" Steve Merrett of Computer and Video Games called it "the most impressive-looking 32X game yet." The "second opinion" reviewer Mark Patterson said it looks good but is hindered by weak explosions and slow gameplay, with the player normally only facing one enemy at a time. He nonetheless deemed it "decent". Mean Machines praised the "Smooth and fast-moving detailed polygon cityscapes" and called it a "thoughtful shoot 'em up that shows the promise of the 32X." Mega said it "could be described as the thinking man's Doom," but that Doom is "better on both the gameplay and presentation sides." One of Game Zeros review team said the game has boring graphics and gameplay, while the other found it reasonably fun and compared its visuals favorably to contemporary mech game Iron Soldier. Both agreed that Metal Head failed to create the feeling of controlling a mech.

The four reviewers of Electronic Gaming Monthly panned the game, with their main criticism being that the gameplay is boring. GamePro instead focused its criticisms on the graphics and sound, calling the digitized talking heads "laughable" and complaining of the rasping quality of the audio. The reviewer remarked that the missions are varied but ultimately boil down to the same actions, and summarized the game as "a promising programming experiment not taken to fruition." Next Generation said that its graphics look good in screenshots, but that the game suffers from slow pacing, glitchy explosions, bad controls, pop-up, a poorly designed change-view feature, and clunky combat.

Notes

References

External links 
 Sega-16.com's Metal Head review and Sega 32X Master's List

1995 video games
First-person shooters
Video games about mecha
Video games about police officers
Sega video games
Sega 32X games
Sega 32X-only games
Terrorism in fiction
Video games scored by Jun Senoue
Video games developed in Japan